Valley Forge Military Academy and College (VFMAC) is a private boarding school (grades 7–12) and military junior college in Wayne, Pennsylvania. It follows in the traditional military school format with army traditions. Though military in tradition and form, the high school portion of VFMAC, Valley Forge Military Academy, is a college-preparatory boarding institution specializing in student leadership. VFMAC's administration is composed almost entirely of current or retired military and the board of trustees is almost entirely alumni. Some graduates pursue careers in the armed services and VFMAC has graduated one Rhodes Scholarship recipient.

Valley Forge Military College is the only private military junior college in the United States. All students are members of the Corps of Cadets. The academy and college were once fully residential, but the academy offers a day-student program.

The Valley Forge Corps of Cadets, entirely student-run, is the only American military organization maintaining British rank, drill, customs, and ceremonies. All cadets must pass a board and earn a "capshield" to be a member of the Corps of Cadets. It is the only corps of cadets in the United States to retain a traditional mounted battalion (squadron), consisting of one cavalry troop and one artillery battery. The college styles cadet uniforms after the Royal Military Academy Sandhurst. The VFMAC Regimental Sergeant Major, Drum Major and Field Music Drum Major wear the British Army Foot Guard uniform, including the red coat and bearskin. Cadet Senior Non-Commissioned Officers (NCOs) carry a British Army pace stick, modeled on that carried by British warrant officers.

The school has established a tradition with the British monarchy;  it follows an American military academy model and practices the Army tradition. VFMAC has a British Army Garrison Sergeant Major, with William 'Billy' Mott, OBE MVO, Welsh Guards (who organized the military parades for the Royal Wedding of The Duke and Duchess of Cambridge, The Diamond Jubilee of Elizabeth II, Ceremonial Funeral of Baroness Thatcher and 13 Trooping the Colour ceremonies) as the first Garrison Sergeant Major appointed as VFMAC staff.

History

1928 – 2005 
Valley Forge Military Academy was founded in 1928 by Lieutenant General Milton G. Baker, Pennsylvania Guard (Retired). For the first five months of its existence, the school was located in Devon, Pennsylvania, on the south side of Berkley Road, between Dorset and Waterloo roads, which is several miles away from the campus's current location. After a fire during the night of January 17–18, 1929 destroyed the original single-building campus, the former Devon Park Hotel, the academy was moved to its present site in Wayne, Pennsylvania, the former Saint Luke's School. The highest decoration in the institution, the Order of Anthony Wayne, was made in tribute to the heroism of the first Corps of Cadets on the night that the first campus burned down.

Initially, General Baker devised an American Revolutionary War motif for the school. The school colors are buff and blue, the colors of the uniforms of the Continental Army. The buildings in the Wayne campus were named for Revolutionary War leaders. At the same time, the academy modeled uniforms, crest, Alma Mater, and rank structure on those of the United States Military Academy at West Point, New York.

During the 1935–1936 school year, Baker expanded the academy to include a two-year college program, with the first college cadets joining the corps that year. Subsequently, the school was known as Valley Forge Military Academy and Junior College. It is known as "Valley Forge Military Academy and College".

In the late 1940s to 1950s, Baker, an Anglophile, began changing the concept and modeled many of the school's drills, customs, and ceremonies after a British motif. The Full Dress Uniforms are modeled from the British Army, while others are ostensibly West Point and British hybrids.

The corps expanded to include artillery (formerly machine guns) in the late 1930s. The school was granted military junior college status by the Department of Defense sometime between the 1940s and the 1960s.

Baker retired as superintendent in 1971 and died at his home on July 31, 1976, at 80.

The 1981 film Taps was filmed at the school.

It began admitting female students in its junior college in 2005.

Abuse Allegations
In April 2019, a former Cadet sued Valley Forge Military Academy for abuse and extreme negligence from the school administration. On February 27, 2017, three juveniles were charged with assault in which they allegedly beat another cadet with a lacrosse stick in a hazing ritual called "Toothpasting". Former Title IX coordinator Robert Wood, revealed in a Title IX complaint about numerous incidents that have occurred at the school including hazing, sexual abuse, rape, assault from alumni, racism, antisemitism, and gross negligence from the school to take action against the cadets in question.

Superintendents and presidents

 Lieutenant General Milton G. Baker, Pennsylvania Guard (Retired), 1928–1971
 Lieutenant General Milton H. Medenbach, Pennsylvania Guard (Retired), 1971
 Major General Robert W. Strong Jr., United States Air Force, (Retired), 1971–1973
 Lieutenant General Willard Pearson, United States Army (Retired), 1973–1985
 Lieutenant General Alexander M. Weyand, United States Army (Retired) 1985–1989
 Colonel Harold J. Fraley, United States Army (Retired), 1989–1990
 Vice Admiral N. Ronald Thunman, United States Navy (Retired), 1990–1993
 Title changed to President in 1992
 Rear Admiral Virgil L. Hill Jr., United States Navy (Retired) 1993–2000
 Rear Admiral Peter A.C. Long, United States Navy (Retired) 2000–2004
 Charles A. McGeorge 2004–2009
 William R. Floyd Jr., 2009–2010
 Colonel David R. Gray, United States Army (Retired) 2010–2012
 Colonel James J. Doyle, USMC, (Retired), Interim President, 2012–2013
 Stacey R. Sauchuk, 2013–2016
 Colonel John C. Church Jr., USMCR (Retired) 2016–2018
 Major General Walter T. Lord U.S. Army (Retired) Class of 1984 (College) 2018-2019
 Colonel Stuart B. Helgeson, USMCR (Retired) 2020–Present

Student body
The school had, as of 2011, 487 students. For the 2017–18 school year, the academy had 213 students in grades 7–12.

For the 2020-2021 Academic year, enrollment for the academy stands at 153 cadets and for the College at 91 cadets.

In June 2018, the school announced that a proposed joint venture with the closed Carson Long Military Academy would result in allowing Carson cadets to transfer to Valley Forge. However, discussions for the proposed joint venture ended when the two schools were unable to find mutually agreeable terms.

Organization of the Corps of Cadets, Regalia and symbols, and History of the corps

The organization of the Corps, similar to the rest of the United States military junior colleges, is unique because the school organized it as a full regiment of three battalions, two infantry, and one mounted. Another difference is in the rank system, a hybrid of United States and British military ranks, and the insignia the school utilizes.

Introduction and History of the Corps of Cadets, the rank structure and insignia 
The cadets are, from 2014 onward, grouped into three battalions, the Mounted and the two Infantry battalions. The companies that form the now two Infantry Battalions are A and B (Academy) and F, G, H, and I (College) while the Mounted Battalion consists of "D" Troop, "E" Battery, and C Company joined in 2018, VFMAC Field Music (formerly also the Drum and Bugle Corps), and the VFMAC Regimental Band. Once, most College Cadets in the infantry battalion were assigned to the "F" Company, but have been divided into "G", "H", and "I" Companies today. "I" Company had been named "I" Troop for all college cadets wishing to participate in equitation. It was once known as "I" Battery for college cadets participating in artillery, but it has now been moved to the collegiate infantry battalion as I Company. Presently, Cadets of the Sixth, Fifth, and Fourth Classes (Grades 7, 8, and 9) are assigned to the "C" Company; formerly, Cadets of the Middle School (Grades 7 and 8) were assigned to the "E" Battery. During the years of highest enrollment, in the 1960s and 1970s, Cadets of the Middle School were assigned to the "H" Company. During the 2009–2010 academic year, given rapid expansion in enrollment, College Cadets have since transferred to the "H" Company. F Company, which formerly had the college cadets, was reformed in 2014 as part of the academy.

Initially, the Corps of Cadets was organized, in the same manner as West Point, as a squadron/battalion of infantry companies with a cavalry troop, under a cadet major, who wore five gold chevrons with an oak leaf. Cadet captains wore four chevrons; cadet lieutenants wore three chevrons, sergeants, and corporals three and two, respectively. Rank insignia then mirrored the USMA. Artillery made their debut in the corps (as E Battery) in 1939, formerly in the machine gun role. Later, the school reorganized the Corps into three battalions: two infantry battalions and a mounted battalion (squadron) of one to two troops and one to two artillery batteries, thus becoming a full regiment or brigade in the process. A cadet lieutenant colonel then headed the corps. The corps and the rank system have since evolved. Cadet officers wear gold rank stars or "pips." Pips are similar in design to the "Order of the Bath" rank stars worn by the British Army and the Royal Marines, except the three crowns have been replaced with an image of George Washington kneeling in the snow, from the painting "The Prayer at Valley Forge" by Henry Brueckner, and the motto "Tria Juncta In Uno" replaced with "Valley Forge Military Academy," as represented in the institutional coat of arms. (Before the design of the school "pips", cadet officers wore the British "pips" design with the crowns.) The school also adopted the rank system from the British Army, Royal Marines, the United States Army, and the United States Marine Corps (only in the Cadet Lance Corporal enlisted rank).

During the 1950s to early 1960s, the officer rank structure of the Corps of Cadets, VFMAC, was:
 the cadet lieutenant colonel wore five pips on his epaulettes, plus the shoulder knots
 Cadet majors, four pips
 Cadet captains, three pips
 Cadet first lieutenants, two pips
 Cadet second lieutenants, one pip on the epaulettes

Other ranks wore the chevrons on the sleeve and were ranked accordingly, with a mix of British and U.S. Army and Marine enlisted ranks. The officer ranks used above were briefly reinstated in 2014–2016.

The officer rank system was increased and improved in the 1960s with the introduction of additional Cadet Captain ranks (from Cadet Captain to Cadet 1st Cpt.). Thus, the officer ranks used until 2014 and reinstated in 2016, but with improved insignia, are from that era, namely:
 Cadet 1st Captain wears two pips and the institutional arms on the epaulettes in between, plus the shoulder knots as mentioned below
 Cadet 2nd Captain, one pip, and the institutional arms
 Cadet 3rd through 8th Captains, four pips
 Cadet Captains, three pips
 Cadet First Lieutenants, two pips
 Cadet Second Lieutenants, one pip on the epaulettes

On the Full Dress Uniforms, Cadet Officers wear rank insignia as on the "School Uniform", except that the Cadet 1st Captain wears braided shoulder knots with a full dress aiguillette in recognition of his role as the Corps Cadet Regimental Commander, who leads the entire Corps. Cadet Sergeants, Corporals, and Lance Corporals wear chevrons on the sleeve: red chevrons on grey for the infantry battalions; red chevrons on black for the mounted components and the band. All cadet officers' shoulder boards are dark blue save for the artillery unit, which from 2012 now wears red shoulder boards after a long absence of their use. The full dress headdress is the Academy Capshield with the VFMAC institutional arms on it, worn on all full dress uniforms since 1980, replacing a similar shako-styled cap with the arms. The institutional full dress is gray blue with black pants (for the academy cadets only as of the present), and from 2009 onwards, a British-styled all-dark blue polo and pants for the college.

On chapel services, peaked caps with the arms are used with the full dress (formerly, these were on the first full dress blue uniforms), while the school service uniform and the BDU includes the side cap and/or the patrol caps which replaced in 2017 the use of the red (college) or blue (academy) military berets used by the corps, with green berets also formerly worn on certain occasions by the academy cadets, similar to US Army Green Berets and Royal Marine Commandos. Recently, baseball caps are beginning to be worn during practice drills.

Academically, the school is organized into six classes, plus College Freshmen and College Sophomores. The academy classes are as follows: First Class: Seniors (12th Grade); Second Class: Juniors (11th Grade); Third Class: Sophomores (10th Grade); Fourth Class: Freshmen (9th Grade); Fifth Class: 8th Grade; and Sixth Class: 7th Grade. Thus, the system is somewhat "inverted" from the "Form" system in use at some schools and more closely parallels West Point and the other FSAs.

Faculty and Staff Officers generally wear military uniforms and generally wear United States Army officer rank insignia save for those who are a part of the United States Air Force, United States Navy, United States Marine Corps and United States Coast Guard and wear their respective rank insignia. Those with Academy Commissions wear the letters "VF" in place of the "U.S." insignia and school crests as branch insignia and unit crest. Reserve, National Guard, and Retired Officers and NCOs, serving in their respective ranks, wear the rank and accouterments of their respective service arm.

VFMAC also employs several British ex-Military personnel, most of whom wear the uniform and rank insignia of their respective British service. The faculty currently includes Royal Navy, Royal Marines Commandos, and Royal Marines Band Service personnel, especially in the academy's regimental band and also as staff and tactical officers.

Ranks used by the VFMAC Corps of Cadets 
This is the complete list of ranks used by the Corps of Cadets of the VFMAC. Former, unused, and honorary ranks are in italics.

Cadet Officers

Cadet Enlisted and NCO's

Component units of the Corps of Cadets
Former units and assignments are indicated in italics.
 A Company (Academy)
 B Company (Academy)
 C Company (Academy)
 D Troop (Academy and College combined cavalry unit, formerly depends on branch, reformed in 2009) (Disbanded in 2020)
 E Battery (Formerly E Company and later the Machine Gun Company under Academy, transformed to artillery battery in 1940 school year)
 F Company (Formerly Academy [1930's] and College, reformed in 2014 under the Academy)
 G Company (Academy and College depending on the year)
 H Company (Middle School or College depending on the year)
 I Company (College) (Formerly I Troop and I Battery, reformed in 2005)
 VFMAC Regimental Band (Academy and College combined)
 VFMAC Field Music (Formerly the Drum and Bugle Corps, established in 1956)
 Headquarters Company
 Machine Gun Company (1939 school year, academy only)

Royalty
VFMAC is a popular school for various royal families. It graduated King Simeon II of Bulgaria. The school serves as Honor Guard to the British Royal Family on State Visits to Philadelphia. Selected cadets also participate in the annual The Versailles Foundation Inc. / Claude Monet-Giverny Dinner.

British military traditions in VFMAC
The British-style drill was practiced at VFMAC until early 2014 but returned in 2017. Many Tactical Officers and staff have been serving, including Command Sergeants Major, Bandmasters, and Commandants and retired members of the British Armed Forces from the Royal Navy, British Army, and Royal Marines. Events such as the Military Tattoo, Regimental Dining In, and Vespers reflect British traditions. Even the Regimental Band reflects this practice in recent years, having been now patterned in the style of the Royal Marines Band Service and British Army line infantry bands. Field Music directly reflects the British military volunteer Corps of Drums.

Valley Forge Military College Cadets wear a Royal Military Academy Sandhurst style uniform.

Cadet Regimental Sergeant Major and Band and Field Music Drum Major wear British Army Foot Guard uniforms.

Cadet senior NCOs carry British Army pace sticks.

The British Officers Club of Philadelphia is based out of the VFMAC.

The Household Division has a long-standing tradition of sending senior NCOs, Sergeants Majors, Warrant Officers, and Officers as short-term and temporary secondment and appointments.

Select VF cadets are granted privilege by the leadership and staff of the Duke of York's Royal Military School in the United Kingdom for exchange studies on their campus.

Coat of arms 
LTG Baker, the founder, designed the coat of arms in 1928. "It consists of a emblem borne on a shield and surmounted by a crest. The shield is of red and white vertical stripes with a blue field containing thirteen stars, one for each of the original states. the crest comprises an eagle with wings displayed and a scroll bearing the motto 'Courage, Honor, Conquer.' The emblem consists of a representation of General George Washington kneeling in prayer in the snow at Valley Forge, over crossed cavalry sabres and surrounded with a circular margin bearing the words 'Valley Forge Military Academy.'" — "The Guidon" Valley Forge Military Academy and College

Academics and student life

The academy's Head of School is Lauren Wochok and Robert F. Smith is the college's provost. VFMAC's Commandant of Cadets is Garrison Sergeant Major William Mott.

Like most American boarding schools, academics at the academy and college are demanding and highly competitive, and there is a mandatory two-hour nightly "study hall" period from 7:30 pm to 9:30 pm in the students' barracks.

The school day generally begins with "First Call" followed by "Reveille," at which time all cadets arise and prepare for formation. Buglers play calls. "First Mess" or breakfast is followed by cleaning details and room preparation. "School Call" is followed by academic classes until lunch, or "Second Mess." After Second Mess, cadets attend academic classes until mid-afternoon. After classes, cadets participate in athletics and extracurricular activities. Cadets may also receive extra instruction during this time. At one time, there were daily formal "Guard Mount" and "Retreat" formations. Owing to the increased tempo of cadet life and requirements of athletics and co-curricular activities needed to have cadets competitively vie for college admission, highly formal Retreat formations are no longer routinely held. After "Third Mess" or the evening meal, cadets return to their barracks for study hall. Study Hall, supervised by faculty officers in rotation, is mandatory for most cadets from Sunday through Thursday. After "Recall" from Study Hall comes the Break, at which time cadets use the telephone, shine shoes, and prepare for the next day. The Break is ended by "Call to Quarters" "Tattoo" and "Taps." At Taps, all cadets, except those granted "Late Lights" to study and cadets of the college, are required to be in bed.

On selected weekends, Cadets are permitted to leave at home. Cadets who achieve academically and in personal efficiency and leadership are allowed additional leaves and local leaves into Wayne and to the King of Prussia mall.

New Cadets at Valley Forge Military Academy and College endure a 4-12 week adjustment period, known as "plebe training," upon entering the institution. During this period, students are trained in the customs and traditions of the school, a modified version of British military drills, and ceremonies. They are given an opportunity to acclimate to the overall campus environment. The conclusion of this period occurs when the students complete the traditional requirement of earning their "Capshield", the brass crest that adorns the uniform cap.

Valley Forge Military Academy and College offers a variety of extracurricular activities to the College Corps, and the Academy Corps.  College extracurriculars include an intramural program, cross country and rifle club level sports, the Creative Camo Art/Writing Club, a martial arts club, a cross country club, and a Press Corps.  College cadets also participate in an annual intramural program of athletics events, academics, and creative challenges leading to the award of the Provost's Cup.  Academy extracurriculars include a drill team, a rifle team, a regimental band, a Boy Scout troop, a Civil Air Patrol unit, and numerous events like International Day, STEM challenges, and service projects..

Character Education program and chapel 
All cadets attend religious services at The Alumni Memorial Chapel of St. Cornelius the Centurion on Sunday morning as a part of the Character Education program. The service, which General Baker developed, is rooted in the Episcopal or Anglican "Book of Common Prayer" and is Christian in nature. It is, however, non-sectarian in practice, as the address, which focuses on character and leadership, is given by the distinguished military, civil, and academic leaders. Brigadier General Alfred A. Sanelli, Class of 1939, B.A., M.A., Pennsylvania Guard (Retired) [Lieutenant Colonel, United States Army (Retired)] (1921–2005), was the long-serving Chaplain and Director of Character Education, after serving as Dean of the academy, Dean of the college, Professor of Military Science, and in other staff positions over many years. He was succeeded as Chaplain by Colonel John E. Steele Jr., Valley Forge Military Academy and College. Effective June 22, 2010, Capt. Gerald Hale, USCG (Ret.), was named the Chaplain and Director of Character Development.

The Chapel contains a 1961 M. P. Moller Pipe Organ donated by the Richard King Mellon family. The organ was dedicated in May 1965, by the Alumni, to Constance Prosser Mellon, wife of Lieutenant General R.K. Mellon.

Sports and traditions

Sports 
VFMA is a member of the PIAA and competes in 13 inter-school sports teams, and VFMC is a member of the NJCAA, Region 19, with 11 men's and women's sports.

Starting in Fall 2020, VFMA offers a Varsity eSports Program. Grades 8-12 compete in the High School eSports League. Grades 7 & 8 compete in the Middle School eSports League. In the Spring Major 2021 season, two players (one middle school, and one high school) qualified for the national playoffs in Super Smash Bros Ultimate and finished the tournament in the top 16 players nationally for their respective league tournaments.

The school discontinued the College Athletic Program at the end of the 2019–2020 school year.

Songs 
The singing of school songs is a tradition at VFMAC. The main songs, among others, are "VFMAC Alma Mater", "the Line of Gray", "Spirit of the Forge", and the "Army Song". Typically, only the first and last verses of the Alma Mater are sung.

The Valley Forge Military Academy Regimental Band

The Valley Forge Military Academy and College Regimental Band is world-famous and has traveled to Europe many times in recent years to perform.

Additionally, some students in the school's band perform regularly on and off-campus on the school's Coronation Heraldic Fanfare Trumpets. The Herald Fanfare Trumpets were brought to Valley Forge in 1953 by Colonel D. Keith Feltham, Valley Forge Military Academy and College, L.R.A.M., A.R.C.M. who served as Bandmaster and Director of Music from September 1949 to June 1976. (Bandmaster Dudley Keith Feltham served as Bandmaster of the 1st Battalion, the Oxfordshire & Buckinghamshire Light Infantry from 1938 to 1949. Colonel Feltham also introduced the British "Slow March" in approximately 1961.) The unique complement of trumpets is regularly used to perform at the academy's weekly chapel services and is frequently booked for domestic and abroad off-campus events. Today the collection consists of the full complement of voices, which consists of six B-flat soprano trumpets, six B-flat tenor trumpets, two G-bass trumpets, and two E-flat soprano trumpets. The original eight heraldic fanfare trumpets have been used on numerous ceremonial occasions associated with royalty: at Westminster Abbey to herald the coronation of King George VI in 1937, at St Paul's Cathedral to herald the Royal Silver Wedding Ceremony, at the wedding of then-Princess Elizabeth and the Duke of Edinburgh in 1947, and at Westminster Abbey for the coronation of Elizabeth II in 1953.

In January 1970, the Philadelphia Orchestra, conducted by Eugene Ormandy, and the Valley Forge Military Academy Band under the leadership of Colonel D. Keith Feltham, performed the "1812 Overture" (full title: Festival Overture "The Year 1812", op. 49); by Pyotr Ilyich Tchaikovsky live at the Academy of Music in Philadelphia. The concert was attended by United States President Richard Nixon. After the rousing performance, Ormandy heralded the cadets as the "Philadelphia Orchestra of Military Bands" and was inspired to produce an updated recording of the overture. In the fall of 1970, the VFMA recorded their tracks of the production in Columbia Studios in New York City. In addition to the VFMA Band, the recording featured the Mormon Tabernacle Choir, directed by Richard P. Condie.

The current Bandmaster is Warrant Officer (II) Phil Evans, Royal Marines Band Service (Retired).

VFMAC Field Music 
Established in 1956, VFMAC Field Music is a separate unit of the Corps of Cadets and has its own officers and shares the same barracks and tactical officer. This unit is a reflection of the British volunteer Corps of Drums tradition. It continues the long heritage of US military field music through the years of the nation's existence and its armed forces. It also has a Drum and Bugle Corps legacy (through the use of brass instruments), and starting from AY 2011-2012, it also has a fife player on its rosters. Aside from its regular participation in school events, parades, on and off-campus formations, and other events, it has a storied history of appearances in Pennsylvania and New Jersey and has been assigned the honor of being the City of Philadelphia's honor guard for distinguished visitors to the city.

Academic and military preparatory programs

Valley Forge Military College degree programs
The Academic Program at VFMC leads to an Associate of Arts, an Associate of Science, or an Associate in Business Administration degree. The strong core curriculum, developed based on careful analysis of the general education requirements of competitive colleges and universities, is the heart of the degree programs. Together with the courses require in the academic fields of study, the core programs provide the foundation for successful transfer to a four-year college and long-term academic success.

There are currently ten associate degree programs at the college and two certificate programs.

Army Reserve Officers' Training Corps and Early Commissioning Program
VFMC offers the Army ROTC Early Commissioning Program (ECP). Successful completion of this two-year program results in a cadet earning a commission as a second lieutenant in the U.S. Army upon graduating as a sophomore from VFMC. Graduates who are commissioned serve in the reserve components (Army Reserve or Army National Guard) while completing their bachelor's degrees. Those who desire active service may compete for a position and serve in the active component of the Army after earning their bachelor's degree. Those selected enter active duty as a first lieutenant, with earned longevity. Those who desire to remain in the Reserve Components after completing their bachelor's degree still have two years of leadership experience and, in addition to a full-time career in the private sector, will have continued leadership opportunities in the Army Reserve or Army National Guard. ECP Lieutenants are obligated to serve for a total of eight years upon commissioning: the initial two years are served in the Reserve Components (Army Reserve or Army National Guard), and the additional six years are served in either the Reserve Components or the Active Component, dependent upon the needs of the Army.

Early Commissioning Program eligibility
Basic ECP eligibility and entrance requirements include a minimum cumulative high school Grading in education grade point average of 2.0 on a 4.0 scale (2.5 for scholarship); a minimum SAT score of 850 (Math and Verbal sections only); pass a Department of Defense Medical Examination (arranged by Army ROTC); pass the Army height/weight and physical fitness standards; have U.S. citizenship (original naturalization document issued by INS or state-issued birth certificate); and be between 17 and 27 years of age and of good moral character.

Cadets may also take the first two years of Army Reserve Officers' Training Corps while attending VFMC. VFMA does not offer the Junior Reserve Officers' Training Corps (JROTC) program.

Valley Forge Military College Service Academy Preparatory Program
The Valley Forge Military College Service Academy Preparation Program (SAP) has as its mission the preparation of qualified college and academy cadets, who have achieved excellence both academically and tactically, for nomination to one of the five United States service academies. These young men and women work together and support each other to gain admission to the United States Military Academy, the United States Naval Academy, the United States Air Force Academy, the United States Coast Guard Academy and the United States Merchant Marine Academy. Each academy's particular need guides VFMC's SAP Program. It works closely with each of the federal academies. The program's hallmark is a personalized curriculum to ensure each cadet is fully prepared for the rigorous academic, physical fitness, moral-ethical issues, and leadership challenges.

In popular culture
Much of the movie Taps (1981), starring George C. Scott and Timothy Hutton, was filmed on the academy's campus. Many of its young stars, including Hutton, Sean Penn, and Tom Cruise, participated in 45 days of orientation with the students of the academy to learn to drill properly as cadets. While most of the actors enjoyed and excelled at their orientation, Cruise opted to leave the training for the comforts of a nearby hotel until filming began, reportedly to isolate himself and "get into the mindset" of his psychopathic character, Cadet Captain David Shawn. Although Taps was presented as depicting core values in a positive light, including honor and loyalty, after the filming, LTG Pearson felt that there was an anti-military tone within the plot of the film. A note in the end credits says the events in the film are not meant to reflect "the educational philosophy or teachings" of then-Valley Forge Military Academy and Junior College.

Notable alumni

Athletics
 Aaron Beasley – professional football player, NFL (Jacksonville Jaguars, New York Jets, Atlanta Falcons)
 George Deiderich – consensus All-American, professional football player, CFL (Montreal Alouettes, Ottawa Rough Riders)
 Chris Doleman – retired professional football player and Pro Football Hall of Famer
 Larry Fitzgerald – professional football player, NFL (Arizona Cardinals) 
 Karl Hankton – professional football player, NFL (Carolina Panthers)
Rasheed Marshall – professional football player, 5th round draft pick (West Virginia) NFL (San Francisco 49ers)
 Jeff Otah – professional football player, NFL (Carolina Panthers)
 Julian Peterson – professional football player, NFL (Seattle Seahawks, San Francisco 49ers, Detroit Lions)
 Gary Stills – professional football player, NFL (Kansas City Chiefs, Baltimore Ravens)
Larry Smith – professional football player, 2nd round draft pick (Florida State) NFL Jacksonville-Green Bay

Business
 William R. ("Bill") Tiefel – chairman of the board of CarMax, Inc.; retired chairman of The Ritz-Carlton Hotel Company, vice chairman of Marriott International, and director of Bulgari hotels and resorts.
 Moritz Hunzinger, CEO Cashcloud SA (Luxemburg), Executive Board Member Gemballa SE (Leonberg), CEO Emeritus (1979–2004) of infas Holding AG – previously Hunzinger Information AG, Media Entrepreneur, Professor of Public Relations and Communication, graduated 1977 from VFMA.

Entertainment
 Steve Agee – actor/comedian/writer: The Suicide Squad, Superstore, The Sarah Silverman Program
 Jimmy Sturr – musician: 14-time Grammy winner
 Barry Sandrew, Ph.D. – neuroscientist, inventor, serial entrepreneur, and pioneering filmmaker who invented colorization and 3-D conversion of feature films
 Kristian Bruun – actor: Notable Canadian actor known for roles in Orphan Black, Carter, The Handmaid's Tale and Madea Takes Manhattan.

Military
 Paul E. Galanti – Commander, United States Navy (Retired); veterans' advocate
 Walter T. Lord – Major General, United States Army
 Herbert Raymond "H.R." McMaster – former National Security Advisor; Lieutenant General, United States Army; historian, author, and former commander of the 3rd Armored Cavalry Regiment during Operation Iraqi Freedom
 Harry J. "Jack" Mier Jr. – major general, Army National Guard of the United States (Retired), Former Adjutant General, Commonwealth of Pennsylvania, Former Commander, 157th Infantry Brigade
 Harry E. Miller Jr. – major general who commanded the 42nd Infantry Division
 Brendan W. O'Connor – Master Sergeant, United States Army: Distinguished Service Cross — Afghanistan
 Gustave F. Perna – General, United States Army: Commanding General of the United States Army Materiel Command.
 Gary Roughead – Admiral, United States Navy (Retired): Chief of Naval Operations
 Alfred A. Sanelli – Brigadier General, Pennsylvania Guard (1921–2005): one of the first cadets, Professor of Military Science, Dean of the academy, Dean of the Junior College, and Chaplain, Valley Forge Military Academy and College, until his death
 H. Norman Schwarzkopf Jr. – General, United States Army (Retired), CENTCOM Commander, Operation Desert Storm
 Robert W. Strong Jr. – Major General, United States Air Force (Retired) (1917–2006): Chief of Staff, Eighth Air Force (1966–1970); Third Superintendent, Valley Forge Military Academy and College
 Kevin R. Wendel – major general, United States Army: Commander, 3rd Brigade, 1st Cavalry Division, 20th Chemical, Biological, Radiological, Nuclear and high-yield Explosives Command, First Army Division East, First United States Army, Combined Security Transition Command – Afghanistan.
 John J. Yeosock – lieutenant general, United States Army (retired), commander, Third Army, Operation Desert Storm.
 Peter Huchthausen – captain in the United States Navy and the author of several maritime books

Politics
 Steve Chiongbian Solon – Governor of the province of Sarangani in the Philippines
 Rafael Hernández Colón – fourth Governor, Commonwealth of Puerto Rico
 Bryan R. Lentz – Democratic politician: State Representative, Pennsylvania House of Representatives, 161st Legislative District
 Bob Mensch – Republican state senator: Pennsylvania State Senate, 24th Senate District
 Westley W.O. Moore – United States Army: Rhodes Scholar, White House Fellow, author of The Other Wes Moore, youth advocate, Governor of Maryland
 Warren Rudman – New Hampshire Republican United States Senator from 1980 to 1993, and New Hampshire Attorney General from 1970 to 1976.
 Simeon Saxe-Coburg-Gotha – King Simeon II of Bulgaria
 Prince Hermann Friedrich of Leiningen

Writers
 J. D. Salinger – author: The Catcher in the Rye

References

External links

 

 
Military education and training in the United States
Radnor Township, Delaware County, Pennsylvania
Private high schools in Pennsylvania
United States military junior colleges
Boarding schools in Pennsylvania
Military high schools in the United States
Educational institutions established in 1928
Boys' schools in the United States
Schools in Delaware County, Pennsylvania
Universities and colleges in Delaware County, Pennsylvania
Private middle schools in Pennsylvania
1928 establishments in Pennsylvania
Private universities and colleges in Pennsylvania
Military bands